The women's individual pursuit (LC 3–4/CP 3) event in cycling at the 2008 Summer Paralympics took place on 10 September at the Laoshan Velodrome.

Preliminaries 
Q = Qualifier
WR = World Record

Finals 
Gold medal match

Bronze medal match

References 

Women's individual pursuit (LC 3-4 CP 3)
2008 in women's track cycling